Kwamera, or South Tanna, the endonym being Nafe (Nɨfe), is a language spoken on the southeastern coast of Tanna Island in Vanuatu.

Writing system

References

 

Languages of Vanuatu
South Vanuatu languages